Ryan James Ellis (born January 3, 1991) is a Canadian professional ice hockey defenceman for the Philadelphia Flyers of the National Hockey League (NHL). Ellis was drafted eleventh overall by the Nashville Predators in the 2009 NHL Entry Draft.

After his second season in the Ontario Hockey League (OHL), Ellis was selected 11th overall by the Predators in the 2009 NHL Entry Draft. During his junior career, he was key in guiding the Windsor Spitfires to back-to-back Memorial Cups as Canadian Hockey League (CHL) champions in 2009 and 2010. Individually, he was named to the CHL and OHL All-Rookie Teams in 2008, the First OHL All-Star Team in 2009 and 2011 and the Second OHL All-Star Team in 2010. He was awarded the OHL's Bobby Smith Trophy as the League's scholastic player of the year in 2008, the Max Kaminsky Trophy as the top defenceman in 2009 and 2011 and the Red Tilson Trophy as the most outstanding player in 2011. On a national basis, he was named CHL Defenceman and Player of the Year in 2011. Serving as the Spitfires' team captain in 2010–11, he became the franchise's all-time leading point-scorer among defencemen.

Ellis began his international career with Canada by winning three gold medals in 2008 at the World U17 Hockey Challenge, IIHF World U18 Championship and Ivan Hlinka Memorial Tournament. At the under-20 level, Ellis has made three appearances at the World Junior Championships, winning gold in 2009 and silver in 2010 and 2011. He is the tournament's all-time leading scorer among defencemen and Canada's all-time assists leader. He also won gold with Team Canada at the 2016 World Championships.

Playing career

Minor
Ellis played minor hockey throughout Ontario, beginning with a club from Belmont, Ontario, at age four. Playing for teams from Mississauga, he won a silver and gold medals at the peewee and bantam provincials, respectively. Joining the Cambridge Hawks at the midget level, he won an Ontario Alliance championship with the club in 2007.

Junior
Ellis was selected in the second round, 22nd overall, by the Windsor Spitfires in the 2007 Ontario Hockey League (OHL) Draft. Establishing himself as a top defenceman in the League during his rookie campaign, he scored 15 goals and 63 points over 63 games. His points total and +30 plus-minus rating led all OHL rookie defencemen. In the 2008 playoffs, Ellis added five points in five games as the Spitfires were eliminated by the Sarnia Sting. He was named to the Canadian Hockey League (CHL) and OHL All-Rookie Teams, along with Spitfires teammate Taylor Hall. Ellis was further recognized for his academic performance, maintaining an 81 percent average in university preparation courses at St. Anne Catholic High School in Belle River, earning him the League's Bobby Smith Trophy as scholastic player of the year. He received the award over fellow nominee Steven Stamkos of the Sting, who had won it the previous year.

Ellis was named OHL Defenceman of the Month for October 2008 the following season. He earned the distinction twice more over the course of the campaign in February and March 2009. On November 3, he was chosen as OHL Player of the Week, having scored seven points in the previous two games. Ellis his second such distinction on April 20, 2009, registering two goals and five assists in three games. During the season, he represented the OHL in the 2008 ADT Canada-Russia Challenge. He also competed for the Western Conference at the 2009 OHL All-Star Classic and participated in the 2009 CHL Top Prospects Game.

Improving to 22 goals, 67 assists and 89 points in 57 games in 2008–09, Ellis led all OHL defencemen and finished second in team scoring to Taylor Hall. He ranked first in the league in assists, seventh in points and second in plus-minus rating (+52). As a result, Ellis was named to the OHL First All-Star Team and awarded the Max Kaminsky Trophy, beating fellow nominees P. K. Subban and Cameron Gaunce as the League's top defenceman. The distinction made him a finalist for CHL Defenceman of the Year, but he lost to Jonathon Blum of the Western Hockey League (WHL)'s Vancouver Giants. Ellis was additionally voted the smartest player, hardest shot and best offensive defenceman in the Western Conference in an annual poll of OHL coaches. Ellis later cited the smartest player selection as his most rewarding recognition to that date.

Windsor entered the 2009 OHL playoffs as the top-ranked team in the OHL West. Ellis added 31 points in 20 games, tying for third in post-season scoring while helping the Spitfires to a J. Ross Robertson Cup as OHL champions. Earning a berth in the 2009 Memorial Cup, the Spitfires went on to win the national major junior championship over the Kelowna Rockets. Ellis recorded four points in six games to be named to the Tournament All-Star Team.

Ellis subsequently attended his first NHL training camp with Nashville in September 2009, but was returned to Windsor after suffering a wrist injury. As a result, he missed ten games with the Spitfires, making his season debut in early-November. Struggling offensively upon recovering, he focused on improving his defensive and physical play. Finishing the season with 61 points over 48 games in 2009–10, he ranked fourth among League defencemen in point-scoring and was named to the OHL Second All-Star Team. Windsor defended both their OHL and Memorial Cup championships in the ensuing post-season. Ellis scored 33 points over 19 games in the OHL playoffs, tying with Jeff Skinner for second in OHL scoring, behind Taylor Hall. Windsor beat the Barrie Colts in the OHL Finals before defeating the Brandon Wheat Kings 9–1 in the Memorial Cup Final. Ellis recorded three assists in the national championship game.

Attending his second Predators training camp, he was again returned to junior for the 2010–11 season. Upon his return to Windsor, he was named team captain. After recording five goals and 17 points in November 2010, he was named OHL Defenceman of the Month. During the month, he surpassed Joel Quenneville as the Spitfires' all-time leading scorer among defencemen. He scored the game-winning goal in overtime against the London Knights on November 10 for his record-setting 230th career point with Windsor. Ellis was honoured in a pre-game ceremony on November 26 for the feat; the game that night against the Oshawa Generals was billed as "Ryan Ellis Night." Also in November, Ellis served as captain for Team OHL in the 2010 Subway Super Series against Russia. Several months later, he recorded his 300th career OHL point on February 25, 2011. Registering three assists in a 4–2 win against the Sault Ste. Marie Greyhounds, he became the third defenceman in OHL history to reach the mark, following Denis Potvin (330 points, 1968–73) and Rick Corriveau (329 points, 1987–92). He completed the season with 313 points all-time. His single-season total of 100 points (24 goals and 76 assists) established a career-high while leading all OHL defencemen by a 21-point margin. It was the first time in over 17 years that an OHL defenceman scored 100 points in a season. Among all OHL skaters, he ranked fifth overall. After winning his second Max Kaminsky Trophy and first Red Tilson Trophy as the OHL's most outstanding defenceman and player, respectively, he was further distinguished as CHL Defenceman and Player of the Year. Ellis beat out Simon Després and Stefan Elliott for the former recognition, while being voted over Sean Couturier and Darcy Kuemper for the latter. It was the first time a player won both awards since Bryan Fogarty did so 22 years prior.

Professional
Going into the 2009 NHL Entry Draft, he was listed by the NHL Central Scouting Bureau as the 16th best prospect (fifth among defencemen) in North America. He was selected in the first round, 11th overall, by the Nashville Predators. Standing at 5 feet and 9 inches (1.75 metres), he was considered small for a defenceman. Addressing this supposed weakness, Hall of Fame defenceman Bobby Orr said of him, "he's not very big, but you'll see...he's a heck of a hockey player." Ellis has publicly discredited any size concerns, alluding to his ability to play physically in spite of it. He has been compared to Detroit Red Wings defenceman Brian Rafalski for his success as a small, offensive defenceman. On January 7, 2012, Ellis scored his first NHL goal with the Predators in a game against the Carolina Hurricanes on goaltender Justin Peters. On August 14, 2018, the Predators re-signed Ellis to an eight-year, $50 million dollar contract extension with a $6.25 million dollar salary starting in the 2019–20 season.

On July 17, 2021, Ellis was traded to the Philadelphia Flyers in exchange for Philippe Myers and Nolan Patrick.

International play

Ellis made his debut with Hockey Canada at the 2008 World U17 Hockey Challenge, representing Ontario, the tournament's host province. He scored his first international goal against Team Pacific on December 29, 2007, a game in which he was also chosen as Ontario's best player. Team Ontario won eight straight games as they won the tournament. With nine points in eight games, Ellis was the tournament's leading defenceman and was named to the All-Star Team, along with Ontario teammate Matt Duchene.

Later that year, Ellis was named to Canada's team for the 2008 IIHF World U18 Championships in Russia. Leading his team in shots on goal, he helped Canada to a gold medal, defeating Russia 8–0 in the final. He recorded a goal and an assist in the championship victory. Finishing with three goals and seven points, he was the tournament's leading defenceman. Four months later, he re-joined the national under-18 team for the 2008 Ivan Hlinka Memorial Tournament, held in Slovakia and the Czech Republic. Ellis led all team defencemen in scoring with five points (a goal and four assists), helping Canada go undefeated in four games. They defeated Russia 6–3 in the final to capture the gold medal.

Moving on to the Canada's under-20 team, he made his first of three World Junior Championship appearances in 2009. Named to the team at 17 years old, he was one of three draft-eligible players on the club with John Tavares and Evander Kane. Head Coach Pat Quinn had coached Ellis previously at the World U18 Championships. He selected Ellis to the team as the eighth defencemen, instead of choosing a traditional 13th forward, because of his abilities on the power play. In the semifinal against Russia, Ellis was instrumental in tying the game with five seconds remaining in regulation. Twice, he preventing the puck from being cleared out of the offensive zone, which allowed a play to develop that resulted in Jordan Eberle's game-tying goal. Canada beat Russia in a shootout before defeating Sweden in the final to win gold. Ellis scored seven points over six games to finish fourth among tournament defencemen in scoring. It also set a Canadian record for most points by a 17-year-old defenceman.

The following year, Ellis returned for the 2010 World Junior Championships in Saskatchewan. Canada went undefeated in the tournament until the gold medal game, where they lost to the United States in overtime. The defeat ended Canada's five-year gold medal streak at the World Juniors and marked the first time Ellis competed in an international competition without winning gold. He finished with eight points over six games, ranking second among tournament defencemen behind teammate Alex Pietrangelo.

As a two-time veteran of Canada's junior team, Ellis opted not to attend their annual summer evaluation camp. In December 2010, he was named to the squad as one of four returning players for the 2011 World Junior Championships, held in Buffalo, New York. Ellis became the seventh player in Canadian history to play three times in the tournament. He was later chosen as team captain. Ellis began the tournament tied with Pietrangelo as the country's all-time top-scoring defenceman at the World Juniors. By scoring a goal in the opening game against Russia, a 6–3 win for Canada, he broke the tie to take the all-time scoring lead among Canadian defencemen. Later in the tournament, Ellis recorded three assists in a game against Norway, making him the World Juniors' all-time leading scorer among defencemen, passing Finnish defenceman Reijo Ruotsalainen's mark of 21 points. In the quarterfinal, he assisted on a goal against Switzerland to break Eric Lindros's 19-assist record as Canada's all-time leader at the tournament. Playing Russia in the gold medal game, Ellis scored the opening goal in a 5–3 losing effort, earning silver for the second consecutive year. Finishing the tournament with three goals and ten points to lead all blueliners, he earned Best Defenceman and All-Star Team honours. He was additionally voted by tournament coaches as one of Canada's best three players. With 25 points over three years at the tournament, he tied Jordan Eberle as Canada's second-best scorer of all-time, behind Lindros' 31 points.

Ellis was a late addition to Team Canada at the 2016 world championships, joining the team in mid-tournament after Nashville was knocked out of the NHL playoffs; the team went on to win the gold medal.

Playing style
Ellis is an offensive defenceman. A fast skater and skilled stickhandler, he is capable of manoeuvring the puck up the ice from the defensive zone. Known as a power play specialist, he often "quarterbacks" from the blueline—controlling puck distribution between teammates in the offensive zone—and possesses a hard and accurate shot. He is also a physical player, though he is undersized as a defenceman at 5 feet and 10 inches (1.78 metres). He is able to compensate for his lack of overpowering strength with good defensive positioning and active stick-checking.

Personal life
Ellis was born in Freelton, Ontario, to parents Jim and Mary Lou. He has one sister. He went to Balaclava Public School followed by, Waterdown High School. Moving away from home for his junior career, he attended St. Anne High School. In February 2010, Ellis was selected as his hometown Hamilton/Burlington area's 2009 Golden Horseshoe Athlete of the Year, beating out college quarterback Danny Brannagan and marathon runner Reid Coolsaet.

Career statistics

Regular season and playoffs

International

Awards and honours

Junior

International

Records
Windsor Spitfires' all-time leading point-scorer, defencemen (surpassed Joel Quenneville, 229 points);
World Junior Championships' all-time leading point-scorer, defencemen – 25 (surpassed Reijo Ruotsalainen, 21 points);
Canadian national junior team's all-time leading assist-scorer – 20 (surpassed Eric Lindros, 19 assists).

Notes

References

External links

 
Ryan Ellis' OHL Profile

1991 births
Canadian ice hockey defencemen
Ice hockey people from Ontario
Living people
Milwaukee Admirals players
Nashville Predators draft picks
Nashville Predators players
National Hockey League first-round draft picks
Philadelphia Flyers players
Sportspeople from Hamilton, Ontario
Windsor Spitfires players